FC Baysachnr Elista was a Russian football team from Elista. It played professionally for a single season, taking 10th place in the Zone 1 of the Russian Second Division in 1993. In 1994 it was converted to the reserves team of FC Uralan Elista called FC Uralan-d Elista.

Team name history
 1992: FC Gilyan Elista
 1993: FC Baysachnr Elista

External links
  Team history at KLISF

Association football clubs established in 1992
Association football clubs disestablished in 1994
Defunct football clubs in Russia
Sport in Elista
1992 establishments in Russia
1994 disestablishments in Russia